Pseudosimochromis curvifrons is a species of mouthbrooding cichlid endemic to Lake Tanganyika. This species can be found in the aquarium trade.

Although Pseudosimochromis has been treated as monotypic, recent authorities have also included several species formerly in Simochromis.

References

curvifrons
Taxa named by Max Poll
Fish described in 1942
Taxonomy articles created by Polbot